Le soldat rose is a 2006 French-language children's musical with music by Louis Chedid and lyrics by Pierre-Dominique Burgaud. The plot of the musical is about a little boy who hides in the toy section of a department store at night, where the toys come to life.

Recording
The musical was first recorded on the Atmosphériques label in 2006 with a cast including Louis Chédid's son Matthieu, or 'M', Jeanne Cherhal, Alain Souchon, Francis Cabrel, Vanessa Paradis and Stéphane Sanseverino. After the studio sessions the recording line-up gave two live shows at Le Grand Rex, Paris, in November 2006, released on DVD in February following. Sales of the CD were above 350,000 by April 207, and the album was awarded Best Chanson/Variétés Album at the 2007 Victoires de la musique.

References

2006 musicals
French musicals